T. Ryan Gregory (born May 16, 1975) is a Canadian evolutionary biologist and genome biologist and a Professor of the Department of Integrative Biology and the Biodiversity Institute of Ontario at the University of Guelph in Guelph, Ontario, Canada.

Career

Gregory completed his B.Sc. (Hons) at McMaster University in Hamilton, Ontario in 1997 and his Ph.D. in evolutionary biology and zoology at the University of Guelph in 2002.  He then carried out postdoctoral work at the American Museum of Natural History in New York City (2002–2003) and the Natural History Museum in London, England (2003–2004) before returning to the University of Guelph as a faculty member.

His research focuses primarily on the issue of genome size evolution (the "C-value enigma") in animals and the origins and biological significance of "junk DNA". He outlined the Onion Test as a "reality check for anyone who thinks they have come up with a universal function for junk DNA".  He created the Animal Genome Size Database in 2001.  He is also active in the DNA barcoding initiative spearheaded by his former Ph.D. adviser, Paul D.N. Hebert at the University of Guelph, with a particular focus on parasites, pathogens, and disease vectors.

Gregory is the author of more than 65 peer-reviewed scientific journal articles with an h-index of 51 according to Google Scholar, and edited the book The Evolution of the Genome in 2004.  He is Senior Handling Editor of the journal Evolution: Education and Outreach founded by Niles Eldredge. He maintained a blog, Genomicron, and created Evolver Zone, an online resource for students and educators.

He has received several awards, including the NSERC Howard Alper Postdoctoral Prize (2003), a McMaster Alumni Association Arch Award (2005), an American Society of Naturalists Young Investigator Prize (2006), the Canadian Society of Zoologists Bob Boutilier New Investigator Award (2007), a University of Guelph Faculty Association Distinguished Professor Award for teaching (2008), and the Genetics Society of Canada Robert H. Haynes Young Scientist Award (2010).

In addition to his scientific and educational interests, he has developed BioArt projects using living organisms. His Microbial Art website, which showcases works by a variety of artists and scientists, has been featured in print and online publications in a variety of countries.

References

1975 births
BioArtists
Canadian biologists
Critics of creationism
Evolutionary biologists
Living people
Academic staff of the University of Guelph
McMaster University alumni
University of Guelph alumni